Class 60 may refer to:

British Rail Class 60, a British diesel locomotive designed for heavy freight duties
Caledonian Railway 60 Class
DRG Class 60, a German steam locomotive class, formerly the LBE Nos. 1 to 3
New South Wales AD60 class locomotive